"The Man with the Power" is an episode of the original The Outer Limits television show. It first aired on 7 October 1963, during the first season.

Introduction
An experiment endows a college professor with powerful telekinetic abilities, which his subconscious mind uses to destroy his enemies, including his employer, Dean Radcliffe.

Opening narration

Plot
Harold J. Finley, an unassuming college professor, develops a device that, once implanted in the brain, can manipulate objects through mind power. Although disregarded as talentless by his family and coworkers, Finley makes an impact with a U.S. space agency in the hopes that he can assist them in retrieving unreachable, space-bound, element-laden asteroids. However, as the professor becomes more familiar with his device, he learns that his subconscious mind has been taking involuntary revenge on those who demean him, including his harping wife, whom he almost kills. As his invention is scheduled to be implanted into the brain of an ambitious astronaut with questionable motives, Finley becomes alarmed, and is determined to stop the procedure. He enters the operating theater just as the surgeon is preparing to implant the device, and destroys him and the head of the asteroid project, along with himself.

Closing narration

Cast

External links
 
 Viewable at hulu.com

The Outer Limits (1963 TV series season 1) episodes
1963 American television episodes
Television episodes about telekinesis
Works about astronauts